Sarita Vihar is a posh residential colony situated in South East Delhi, India. It is near the Kalindi Kunj- Noida Toll bridge or GD Birla Marg-Road 13A which connects the district to Noida. It is believed that the site was primarily chosen as the construction site for the Games Village of the 1982 Asian Games, however on the insistence of the late Prime Minister Rajiv Gandhi, the plan was changed to convert it into an upscale residential housing locality. In 2013, it was awarded the "Greenest Colony in Delhi" tag by the then Chief Minister of Delhi, Ms. Sheila Dikshit, credited to the efforts of its RWA members who have aggressively worked towards improving the state of parks and green spots in the locality.

Description
Sarita Vihar is located close to the confluence of 3 states namely Delhi, Uttar Pradesh & Haryana and hence has arterial roads with massive traffic movement, connecting the capital with the industrial town of Faridabad, Noida & Greater Noida. It is at a 10 minutes drive with normal road traffic from Noida, Uttar Pradesh, this connectivity advantage means it has become one of the most suitable places to live in South Delhi, giving the residents easy access to various places. Situated on Mathura Road (part of National Highway (NH-2), the colony is easily accessible and its connectivity has been further enhanced by a Metro line (Violet Line) with a dedicated metro station in its name next to it is Apollo Hospital (the biggest corporate hospital in Delhi), District Center, a modern sports complex (Netaji Subhash Sports Complex), Kalindi Kunj and District Police Headquarters.

Okhla Industrial Areas, Phases I and II, are located just opposite of Sarita Vihar on the other side of NH-2.The Sarita Vihar underpass, constructed by the Delhi Development Authority and the Railways, Inaugurated by Venkaiah Naidu in 2014 cuts down the distance between Noida and Okhla from an excruciating 9 km to just 1 km and reduces the travel time from 45 minutes to 10 minutes. It  made convenient to reach these two industrial hubs of Delhi for Noida and Faridabad commuters and played a pivotal role in improving the traffic condition in the locality, which has swelled up in the last few years.

There are massive infrastructure projects in the pipeline in March 2019 Union minister for road transport and highways Nitin Gadkari laid the foundation stone for a 59-km six-lane national highway connecting New Delhi’s Ring Road with the under-construction Delhi-Mumbai Expressway.
The highway alignment was announced by the Centre in May, 2018. The access-controlled highway project will start at the Ring Road-DND junction, pass through the Kalindi bypass and Faridabad-Ballabhgarh bypass, and will finish at the interchange of the Delhi-Mumbai Expressway at the Western Peripheral Expressway or Kundli-Manesar–Palwal (KMP) Expressway this Project is going to further enhance the appeal of Sarita Vihar 

Mohan Cooperative Industrial Estate is nearby, stretching parallel to Sarita Vihar. It is a hub for almost all Indian and international car showrooms (Rolls-Royce, Aston Martin, Audi, Lamborghini, Honda, Maruti Suzuki, Skoda, BMW, Jaguar, Land Rover, Hyundai, Ford, Toyota, TATA, Mahindra, Mercedes, Porsche, Renault, Fiat, Ferrari, Lamborghini etc.) making it one of the most diversified locations for car buyers. Such a stretch of showroom is probably unseen in any part of the country. International BPO's, software houses, offices both ultra modern in Jasola and classical ones many eating joints, such as Haldiram's, Pind Balluchi, Domino's, Pizza Hut, Moti Mahal Deluxe, Subway, Cafe Coffee Day and Sagar Ratna are also present. Nehru Place, the biggest computer hardware and accessories market in Asia, and Lajpat Nagar a shopping market, are within 5–7 km of Sarita Vihar and are easily accessible by road as well as Metro Line. Most importantly, the people travelling between Noida and Okhla will now save both on time and fuel as the 1,090-metre Sarita Vihar underpass was opened in December, 2014.

Hospitals 
 All India Institute of Ayurveda, Delhi The AIIAD project completed in 2016 by the Delhi government for construction of the All India Institute of Ayurveda, Delhi at Sarita Vihar.
 Indraprastha Apollo Hospital, is a stone's throw from Sarita Vihar, and has proven to be a boon for residents, providing some of the best medical facilities in the country. 
 Fortis Escorts Heart Institute and 
 Holy Family Hospital are some of the hospitals located within the radius of 5 km of Sarita Vihar.

School and institutes 
There are many schools and institutes located in Sarita Vihar. A few of the schools are:

DAV Public School
Tansen Sangeet Mahavidlkaya
GURUKUL play school/Day boarding for Kids
GD Goenka Public School, Sarita Vihar
Glory Public School
Shemrock Play School
Dreamland Play School
Marigolds Play School
Kinderland Play School
Saint Giri Senior Secondary School
St. Joseph School
McD Boys School
Rajkiya Sarvodaya Bal Vidyalaya

Institutes include:
 SCP INFOTECH INSTITUTE Computer Education and NIELIT Facilitation Center  
Periyar Management and Computer College 
Asia-Pacific Institute of Management
Global Institute of Management Technology

Social and religious organisations 
 SCP Foundation (NGO)
 Goonj (NGO)
 mykheti (eFarming)

See also
 Neighbourhoods of Delhi

Areas nearby
 Greater Kailash
 Kalka Mandir
 Lajpat Nagar
 Nehru Place
 New Friends Colony
 Kalkaji
 Noida
 Faridabad
 Govindpuri
 Okhla
 Greater Kailash
 Mohan Estate
 Badarpur
 Maharani Bagh

References 

District subdivisions of Delhi
Neighbourhoods in Delhi
South East Delhi district